Central Baptist Church may refer to:

Australia
 Central Baptist Church (Sydney)

India
 Central Baptist Church (Delhi)

United Kingdom
 Central Baptist Church (Leicester)
 Central Baptist Church, Southampton

United States
 Central Baptist Church (Miami, Florida), listed on the National Register of Historic Places (NRHP)
 Central Baptist Church (Honolulu, Hawaii)
 Central Baptist Church (St. Louis, Missouri) 
 Central Baptist Church (Muskogee, Oklahoma), NRHP-listed
 Central Baptist Church (Charleston, South Carolina), NRHP-listed
 Central Baptist Church (Sioux Falls, South Dakota)